Barbara Plett Usher is a Canadian-born UK journalist with experience in the Middle East and the UN. She has worked for the BBC in Jerusalem, Islamabad and the United Nations.

Since 2021 she has been the BBC's State Department Correspondent, based in Washington, D.C., USA.

Education
Plett Usher graduated from Carleton University in Ottawa, Ontario, Canada, in 1991 with a bachelor's degree in journalism.

Personal life
Plett Usher was married to Graham Usher, the former Jerusalem correspondent of The Economist magazine. He died on August 8, 2013, at age 54 of Creutzfeldt–Jakob disease.

Career
She joined the BBC as a freelancer from Cairo in 1995 and became its Middle East correspondent by 2000.

She then went on to cover the death of the Syrian President Hafez al Assad in 2000 and to do much reporting under siege in Ramallah in 2002. Her career took her to Iraq in 2003.

Plett Usher worked as BBC correspondent in Jerusalem before being transferred to Islamabad in 2009. She was the BBC's United Nations correspondent since at least 2012 

During the BBC programme From Our Own Correspondent broadcast on 30 September 2004, Plett Usher said she cried when she saw Palestinian leader Yasser Arafat being taken to hospital during his terminal illness. This led to suggestions that the BBC  was biased. After many complaints from viewers the BBC Governors' Programme Complaints Committee ruled that Plett Usher had breached editorial guidelines on due impartiality and the BBC's director of News, Helen Boaden, apologised for an editorial misjudgment.

See also
Media coverage of the Arab–Israeli conflict
Criticism of the BBC

References

External links
BBC News: Could the Middle East become a nuclear-free zone?

BBC newsreaders and journalists
British journalists
British women journalists
British radio presenters
British women radio presenters
Carleton University alumni
1967 births
Living people
BBC World News
Canadian women television journalists
Canadian expatriates in the United Kingdom
Canadian people of Iranian descent
Canadian radio hosts
Canadian women radio presenters
Journalists from Manitoba